Adeline Albright Wigand (1852-1944) was an American painter. She was one of the first presidents of the National Association of Women Artists. She is known for her portrait paintings.

Biography
Wigand née Albright was born on June 24, 1852 in Madison, New Jersey. She was raised in Cedar Rapids, Iowa. She studied at the
Art Students League and  Cooper Union Art School in New York. Her teachers in New York included William Merritt Chase.

Wigand traveled to Paris in the mid-1880s where she studied at the Académie Julian. Her instructors included Tony Robert-Fleury and William-Adolphe Bouguereau.

Albright married fellow artist Otto Charles Wigand in 1890.

Wigand exhibited her work at the Palace of Fine Arts at the 1893 World's Columbian Exposition in Chicago, Illinois. Wigand exhibited, and won prizes, at the National Academy of Design, the National Arts Club, and the National Association of Women Artists. Additionally she exhibited at the Art Institute of Chicago, the Corcoran Gallery of Art, and the Paris Salon.

Wigand's listing in Woman's Who's Who of America: A Biographical Dictionary of Contemporary Women of the United States and Canada, 1914-1915 noted that she "Favors  woman suffrage". Wigand was a member of the National Association of Women Artists, serving as one of its first presidents. She also served as the head of the Art Committee of the Staten Island Institute of Arts and Sciences from 1925 to 1931.

Wigand died on March 31, 1944.

Legacy
In 2010-2011 the Wigands were the subject of a retrospective, Beauty Rediscovered: Paintings by Adeline Albright Wigand & Otto Charles Wigand, at the Staten Island Museum, New York.

Gallery

References

External links
Brochure from Beauty Rediscovered

1852 births
1944 deaths
American women painters
19th-century American women artists
20th-century American women artists
19th-century American painters
20th-century American painters